Litosphingia corticea is a moth of the family Sphingidae. It is known from savanna and bush from Matabeleland to Tanzania.

The length of the forewings is about 22 mm for males and about 27 mm for females. Both wings are long and narrow. The body is grey with a dark dorsal line. The wings are grey with darker veins. Females are larger, darker and have more rounded wings than males.

References

Sphingini
Lepidoptera of Tanzania
Lepidoptera of Zimbabwe
Moths of Sub-Saharan Africa
Moths described in 1920